Keezhaiyur is a revenue village in the Karaikal taluk of Karaikal District. It is situated at a distance of about 6 kilometres south-east of Karaikal town and 2 kilometres east of Tirumalarajanpattinam commune.

References 

 

Villages in Karaikal district